Bernard Ward (born 1918) was a Bermudian sailor. He competed in the Dragon event at the 1956 Summer Olympics.

References

External links
 

1918 births
Year of death missing
Bermudian male sailors (sport)
Olympic sailors of Bermuda
Sailors at the 1956 Summer Olympics – Dragon
Place of birth missing